The 87th New York State Legislature, consisting of the New York State Senate and the New York State Assembly, met from January 5 to April 23, 1864, during the second year of Horatio Seymour's second tenure as Governor of New York, in Albany.

Background
Under the provisions of the New York Constitution of 1846, 32 Senators and 128 assemblymen were elected in single-seat districts; senators for a two-year term, assemblymen for a one-year term. The senatorial districts were made up of entire counties, except New York County (four districts) and Kings County (two districts). The Assembly districts were made up of entire towns, or city wards, forming a contiguous area, all within the same county.

At this time there were two major political parties: the Republican Party and the Democratic Party. The Democrats split over the civil war issue. The "War Democrats" and the Republicans formed a coalition known as the "Republican Union," and supported President Abraham Lincoln and the Union Army's war effort; the rump Democratic Party opposed the war, favoring a compromise with the South, and became known as "Peace Democrats" or "Copperheads."

Elections
The New York state election, 1863 was held on November 3. All eight statewide elective offices up for election were carried by the Republican Union. The approximate party strength at this election, as expressed by the vote for Secretary of State, was: Republican Union 314,000 and Democrats 285,000.

Sessions
The Legislature met for the regular session at the Old State Capitol in Albany on January 5, 1864; and adjourned on April 23.

Thomas G. Alvord (R) was elected again Speaker with 77 votes against 42 for Jacob L. Smith (D). Joseph B. Cushman (R) was re-elected Clerk of the Assembly with 78 votes against 44 for John C. Jacobs (D).

On February 3, James M. Cook (R) was elected president pro tempore of the State Senate "for this day."

On February 4, James A. Bell (R) was elected president pro tempore of the State Senate "for the present session."

State Senate

Districts

 1st District: Queens, Richmond and Suffolk counties
 2nd District: 1st, 2nd, 3rd, 4th, 5th, 7th, 11th, 13th and 19th wards of the City of Brooklyn
 3rd District: 6th, 8th, 9th, 10th, 12th, 14th, 15th, 16th, 17th and 18th wards of the City of Brooklyn; and all towns in Kings County
 4th District: 1st, 2nd, 3rd, 4th, 5th, 6th, 7th, 8th and 14th wards of New York City
 5th District: 10th, 11th, 13th and 17th wards of New York City
 6th District: 9th, 15th, 16th and 18th wards of New York City
 7th District: 12th, 19th, 20th, 21st and 22nd wards of New York City
 8th District: Putnam, Rockland and Westchester counties
 9th District: Orange and Sullivan counties
 10th District: Greene and Ulster counties
 11th District: Columbia and Dutchess counties
 12th District: Rensselaer and Washington counties
 13th District: Albany County 
 14th District: Delaware, Schenectady  and Schoharie counties
 15th District: Fulton, Hamilton, Montgomery and Saratoga counties
 16th District: Clinton, Essex and Warren counties
 17th District: Franklin and St. Lawrence counties
 18th District: Jefferson and Lewis counties
 19th District: Oneida County
 20th District: Herkimer and Otsego counties
 21st District: Oswego County
 22nd District: Onondaga County
 23rd District: Chenango, Cortland and Madison counties
 24th District: Broome, Tompkins and Tioga counties
 25th District: Cayuga and Wayne counties
 26th District: Ontario, Seneca and Yates counties
 27th District: Chemung, Schuyler and Steuben counties
 28th District: Monroe County
 29th District: Genesee, Niagara and Orleans counties
 30th District: Allegany, Livingston and Wyoming counties
 31st District: Erie County
 32nd District: Cattaraugus and Chautauqua counties

Note: There are now 62 counties in the State of New York. The counties which are not mentioned in this list had not yet been established, or sufficiently organized, the area being included in one or more of the abovementioned counties.

Members
The asterisk (*) denotes members of the previous Legislature who continued in office as members of this Legislature. Thomas C. Fields, Saxton Smith, Palmer E. Havens and Ezra Cornell changed from the Assembly to the Senate.

Party affiliations follow the vote for Regents of USNY.

Employees
 Clerk: James Terwilliger
 Sergeant-at-Arms: Azel B. Hull
 Assistant Sergeant-at-Arms: Sanders Wilson
 Doorkeeper: Lawrence Van Duzen
 First Assistant Doorkeeper: Casper Walter
 Second Assistant Doorkeeper: Edmund Traver
 Third Assistant Doorkeeper: Anson W. Johnson

State Assembly

Assemblymen
The asterisk (*) denotes members of the previous Legislature who continued as members of this Legislature.

Party affiliations follow the vote for Speaker, and Regents of USNY.

Employees
 Clerk:  Joseph B. Cushman
 Sergeant-at-Arms: Charles E. Young
 Doorkeeper: Henry A. Rogers
 First Assistant Doorkeeper: Alexander Frier
 Second Assistant Doorkeeper: Daniel F. Payne

Notes

Sources
 The New York Civil List compiled by Franklin Benjamin Hough, Stephen C. Hutchins and Edgar Albert Werner (1870; see pg. 439 for Senate districts; pg. 443 for senators; pg. 450–463 for Assembly districts; and pg. 499ff for assemblymen)
 Journal of the Senate (87th Session) (1864)
 Journal of the Assembly (87th Session) (1864)

087
1864 in New York (state)
1864 U.S. legislative sessions